Russian Foundation for Technological Development (Russian: Российский фонд технологического развития) is the development institute of the Russian Federation which exists for more than 20 years and provides the financial support to science and technology projects and exploratory developments by means of the targeted debt financing.

The Director of the RTDF is Mikhail B. Rogachev.

Activity 

Russian Foundation for Technological Development offers concessional repayment financing  for a period up to 60 months. Project selection is done on the basis of the contest results. The Foundation does not demand additional collateral, provided that the loan amount does not exceed the net assets of the applicant company. The business entities shall grant the Foundation the possibility to control the purpose-oriented use of the funds received.
The Foundation combines financial support of the innovation activity of enterprises with a whole range of consultation services in innovation management and company development. 
Since March 2013 by the decision of the Ministry of Economic Development and the Ministry of Education and Science of the Russian Federation, the Foundation acts as an organization providing support of the Russian Technology Platforms activity.

Operating results 

Support of RFTD gave a considerable contribution to the development of such high-tech companies such as: 
SPA "Unikhimteck" (composite material)  
NT-MTD (manufacture of tunnel microscopes),
RDC "Module" (creation of neurochips),
Svetlana-Optoelektronika CJSC (LED equipment and instruments), 
Lazeks CJSC (navigational equipment), and others.

The Foundation, in cooperation with the organizations that coordinate Russian Technology Platforms with the assistance of the Ministry of Economic Development and the Ministry of Education and Science of the Russian Federation, prepared and published in English and Russian the information publications: summary booklet for the whole 32 Technology Platforms and separate booklets for each technology platform. The publications contain the information about the key technological directions, its organizational structure, participants, key results of activity and plans for 2012-2013 as well as the necessary contact details.

References

External links
 
RFTD and structure of the Russian research system

1991 establishments in Russia
Organizations based in Moscow
Research institutes established in 1991
Research institutes in Russia